John Bernard Erickson (born October 16, 1944) is a former American football linebacker who played two seasons in the American Football League with the San Diego Chargers and Cincinnati Bengals. He was drafted by the Chargers in the fifth round of the 1967 NFL Draft. He played college football at Abilene Christian University and attended Clifton High School in Clifton, Texas.

References

External links
Just Sports Stats

Living people
1944 births
Players of American football from Texas
American football linebackers
Abilene Christian Wildcats football players
San Diego Chargers players
Cincinnati Bengals players
People from Clifton, Texas
American Football League players